Alexandra Mitsotaki is a Greek activist and social entrepreneur. She is cofounder and president of the World Human Forum. In 2019 she launched the Convergences Greece Forum. She founded ActionAid Hellas in 1998 and served as its chair until 2017. In this capacity, in 2014 she co-founded Greece's first microcredit institution, Action Finance Initiative (AFI). In 2009 she became president of the Greek Cultural Centre in Paris.

Early life 
Mitsotaki was born in 1956 in Athens to Greece's future Prime Minister Konstantinos Mitsotakis and his wife Marika. Her adolescence was marked by her father's imprisonment in 1967 at the hands of the Greek military junta, and her family's subsequent house arrest until they managed to leave Greece in 1968. She subsequently lived in exile in Paris together with her parents and three siblings (Dora, Katerina and Kyriakos) until they were able to return to Greece in 1973.

After finishing her German Abitur (secondary-school diploma) in Athens, Alexandra earned her master's degree in political science at the Institute of Political Studies ("Sciences Po") in Paris. She holds a postgraduate degree in development law from the University of Paris V.

Career
Her professional life began at the OECD in Paris, where she worked in the Education Directorate and the Development Centre. Her work sought to deepen policy makers’ understanding of the challenges of development and fighting poverty.

In 1998 Mitsotaki created Greece's first international development NGO, ActionAid Hellas (AAH). She has chaired AAH from 2007 to 2017.

Mitsotaki was a member of the board of ActionAid International (AAI) from 2003 to 2015. She served on AAI board committees Governance and Board Development Committee, and the Finance and Funding Committee.

Realising the importance of helping Greece's increasingly vulnerable population since the economic crisis, in 2014 she and AAH working in partnership with the French NGO Adie France created Greece's first micro-credit institution: Action Finance Initiative (AFI).

From 2009 to 2019, as its President, she was in charge of the Hellenic Cultural Centre in Paris, of which she is now vice-chair. The aim of the Centre is to establish a tool of cultural diplomacy for Greece in the Francophone world.

In 2017 she initiated from Delphi Greece the creation of the World Human Forum, a bottom up global citizens initiative. The aim of the WHF is to highlight and connect innovative and creative forces underlining the need for a shift of paradigm and the creation of a new ecological civilisation. In that context in 2019 she launched the Convergences Greece Forum.

Mitsotaki occasionally teaches a course with American economist Charles P. Oman on the political economy of international development at Sciences Po in Paris.

Personal life
In 1979 Mitsotaki married a French lawyer with whom she has four children and nine grandchildren.

Based in Paris, she spends much time in Greece and maintains close ties to her sisters Dora and Katerina, her brother Kyriakos who in July 2019 became Prime Minister of Greece, and other members of her Greek family. Before her mother died in 2012, Mitsotaki organized the production and publication of her mother's book Recipes of Love.
After her father's death she took over the role of vice-president at the Konstantinos Mitsotakis Foundation adding to its work an ecological orientation. The first initiative in that direction was the production of the documentary film Mountain Symphonies on Konstantinos Mitsotakis life and his visionary ecological work.

In addition to Greek, she speaks fluent German, French and English.

Notes and references

Living people
Greek activists
People from Athens
1956 births
Paris Descartes University alumni
Sciences Po alumni
Academic staff of Sciences Po
Greek expatriates in France
Alexandra
OECD officials
Microfinance people
Chairpersons of non-governmental organizations